Monroeville is the county seat of Monroe County, Alabama, United States. At the 2020 census its population was 5,951.

Monroeville is known as the hometown of two prominent writers of the post-World War II period, Truman Capote and Harper Lee, who were childhood friends in the 1930s. Lee's 1960 novel To Kill a Mockingbird earned her the Pulitzer Prize. The lasting fame of To Kill a Mockingbird became a tourist draw for the town. In 1997, the Alabama Legislature designated Monroeville and Monroe County as the "Literary Capital of Alabama". Monroeville is also the home of Walter McMillian, who was defended by Bryan Stevenson in overturning a wrongful conviction and featured in his memoir Just Mercy (2014), as well as the 2019 eponymous movie adaptation. Monroeville is also the birthplace of Cynthia Tucker, born March 13, 1955, an American journalist whose weekly column is syndicated by Universal Uclick. She received a Pulitzer Prize for Commentary in 2007 for her work at the Atlanta Journal-Constitution, where she served as editorial page editor. She was also a Pulitzer finalist in 2004 and 2006.

History
Occupied for thousands of years by indigenous peoples, this area was ceded by the historic tribe to the U.S. government in the 1830s and the era of Indian Removal. 

The town was first known as Walker's Mill and Store, named for Major Walker, the area's first European-American settler. In 1832, the legislature relocated the county seat to Monroeville from Claiborne on the Alabama River. The settlement was briefly renamed "Centerville" due to its location in the center of the county, and then was formally changed to Monroeville. The town was not formally incorporated until April 15, 1899.

Geography
Monroeville is located at  (31.518075, -87.327543).

Almost all of the urban area lies on Bama fine sandy loam. Less developed areas around town are mostly on Saffell gravelly sandy loam or Flomaton gravelly loamy sand.

Demographics

At the 2000 census there were 6,862 people, 2,687 households, and 1,870 families living in the city. The racial makeup of the city was 53.09% White, 44.84% Black or African American, 0.38% Native American, 0.58% Asian, 0.15% from other races, and 0.96% from two or more races. 0.90% of the population were Hispanic or Latino of any race.
Of the 2,687 households 34.3% had children under the age of 18 living with them, 48.0% were married couples living together, 18.9% had a female householder with no husband present, and 30.4% were non-families. 28.0% of households were one person and 11.7% were one person aged 65 or older. The average household size was 2.46 and the average family size was 3.04.

The age distribution was 27.7% under the age of 18, 8.9% from 18 to 24, 24.6% from 25 to 44, 22.2% from 45 to 64, and 16.6% 65 or older. The median age was 36 years. For every 100 females, there were 82.0 males. For every 100 females age 18 and over, there were 76.4 males.

The median household income was $28,229 and the median family income  was $36,476. Males had a median income of $35,600 versus $20,184 for females. The per capita income for the city was $17,070. About 20.4% of families and 23.0% of the population were below the poverty line, including 29.0% of those under age 18 and 19.2% of those age 65 or over.

2010 census
At the 2010 census there were 6,519 people, 2,656 households, and 1,723 families living in the city. The racial makeup of the city was 55.7% White, 42.1% Black or African American, 0.3% Native American, 0.3% Asian, 0.3% from other races, and 1.2% from two or more races. 0.8% of the population were Hispanic or Latino of any race.
Of the 2,656 households 28.4% had children under the age of 18 living with them, 39.8% were married couples living together, 21.1% had a female householder with no husband present, and 35.1% were non-families. 30.5% of households were one person and 12.9% were one person aged 65 or older. The average household size was 2.37 and the average family size was 2.95.

The age distribution was 24.6% under the age of 18, 9.4% from 18 to 24, 21.8% from 25 to 44, 26.2% from 45 to 64, and 18.0% 65 or older. The median age was 40.2 years. For every 100 females, there were 87.7 males. For every 100 females age 18 and over, there were 88.5 males.

The median household income was $31,593 and the median family income  was $49,548. Males had a median income of $41,324 versus $31,033 for females. The per capita income for the city was $20,553. About 23.3% of families and 27.7% of the population were below the poverty line, including 37.3% of those under age 18 and 19.0% of those age 65 or over today.

2020 census

As of the 2020 census, there were 5,951 people, 2,106 households, and 1,259 families residing in the city.

Education
Monroeville is home to Coastal Alabama Community College, a state-supported, fully accredited, comprehensive two-year college serving southwest Alabama. Its main campuses are in Monroeville and Thomasville.

Arts and culture

Literary fame
]]
Author Harper Lee was born and raised in Monroeville. Her 1960 novel To Kill a Mockingbird, which received the 1961 Pulitzer Prize for Fiction, explored the fictional town of Maycomb, inspired by her hometown. Her other novel, Go Set a Watchman, is also set in Maycomb. Truman Capote, best known for his novella Breakfast at Tiffany's and his non-fiction novel In Cold Blood, spent part of his childhood in Monroeville. Lee and Capote were neighbors and remained close friends into adulthood. Capote's early novels, including Other Voices, Other Rooms and The Grass Harp, draw heavily on his childhood in Monroeville. Capote has acknowledged being the inspiration for the character of Dill in To Kill a Mockingbird, while Lee in turn was the inspiration for the character of Idabel in Other Voices, Other Rooms. 

Novelist Mark Childress and Cynthia Tucker, syndicated columnist and winner of the 2007 Pulitzer Prize for Commentary, were also born in Monroeville.

Annual cultural events
As of 2006, an estimated 30,000 tourists visited Monroeville annually due to its association with the novel and adaptations of To Kill a Mockingbird. Each May, the Monroe County Heritage Museum stages an amateur play based on the book on the grounds of the courthouse. The interior of the courthouse was used as a reference for the film version of the book. It is the venue for the later amateur productions. The all-volunteer cast has been invited to perform in Washington, D.C., Kingston upon Hull and Jerusalem. In 1997, the Alabama Legislature designated Monroeville and Monroe County the "Literary Capital of Alabama".

Television
In the television show Private Practice, created and produced by Shonda Rhimes, the fictional character Charlotte King was born in Monroeville.

Notable people
 Marsha Barbour, first lady of the State of Mississippi from 2004 to 2012
 Chris Booker, Major League Baseball player
 Truman Capote, author
 Mark Childress, novelist 
 Marva Collins, educator
 Amasa Coleman Lee, lawyer and legislator
 Harper Lee, author of To Kill a Mockingbird and Go Set a Watchman
 Walter McMillian, exonerated and freed in 1993 after being sentenced to death in a wrongful conviction
 Allison Moorer, folk singer
 Fannie E. Motley, first African-American student to graduate from Spring Hill College
 Marie Rudisill, author and television personality
 Cynthia Tucker, syndicated columnist who won the 2007 Pulitzer Prize for Commentary, was born here
 Tytus Howard, current tackle for the Houston Texans

References

Bibliography
 Shields, Charles. Mockingbird: A Portrait of Harper Lee. Henry Holt and Co.: 2006.

External links
City of Monroeville official website
Monroeville/Monroe County Economic Development Authority
Monroeville Chamber of Commerce
Monroe County Heritage Museums
Monroeville on the Southern Literary Trail
Coastal Gateway Regional Economic Development Alliance

Cities in Alabama
Cities in Monroe County, Alabama
County seats in Alabama